Alexandru Krisztián Blidar (born 19 December 2002) is a Romanian professional footballer who plays as a right midfielder for Liga I side FC U Craiova 1948.

Club career

FC U Craiova 1948
He made his league debut on 17 October 2021 in Liga I match against UTA Arad.

Honours
FC U Craiova
Liga II: 2020–21

References

External links
 
 

2002 births
Sportspeople from Oradea
Romanian sportspeople of Hungarian descent
Footballers from Budapest
Living people
Romanian footballers
Association football midfielders
Liga I players
Liga II players
FC U Craiova 1948 players